Pašiaušė is a village in Lithuania, between Šiauliai and Panevėžys. According to census of 2001, it had 191 residents.

Notable people

 Jan Prosper Witkiewicz - a 19th-century Lithuanian orientalist, explorer and diplomat in Russian service in Central Asia.

References

Villages in Šiauliai County
Shavelsky Uyezd
Kelmė District Municipality